The Department of Homeland Security Appropriations Act, 2007 is a U.S. Act of Congress signed into law by President George W. Bush on October 4, 2006. The appropriation bill appropriates about $33.8 billion in homeland security funding, nearly $1.2 billion of which will go towards fencing off the southwest border of the United States as well as other barriers and technology to prevent illegal immigration.

References

United States Department of Homeland Security
United States federal appropriations legislation
Acts of the 109th United States Congress